Nuclear layer may refer to:

 Inner nuclear layer
 Outer nuclear layer